Ratu Maharani Shima was the queen regnant of the 7th century Kalingga kingdom on the northern coast of Central Java circa 674 CE.

She introduced a law against thievery to encourage her people to be honest and uphold truth. According to tradition, a foreign king placed a bag filled with gold on the intersection in Kalingga to test the famed truthfulness and honesty of Kalingga people. Nobody dared to touch a bag that did not belong to them, until three years later Shima's son, the crown prince accidentally touched the bag with his feet. The queen issued a death sentence to her own son, but was overruled by the minister that appealed to the queen to spare the prince's life. Since it was prince's foot that touched the bag of gold, it was the foot that must be punished through mutilation.

Shima's great-grandson is Sanjaya, who was the king of the Sunda and Galuh kingdoms, and also the founder of the Mataram Kingdom of Central Java.

References 

History of Central Java
Hindu monarchs
Indonesian monarchs
Queens regnant in Asia
7th-century women rulers
Women rulers in Indonesia
7th-century Indonesian women